Phillip Blaine Merling (born April 19, 1985) is a former American football defensive end. He was drafted by the Miami Dolphins in the second round of the 2008 NFL Draft. He played college football at Clemson University.

He was also a member of the Green Bay Packers and Washington Redskins.

Early years
Merling played tight end and defensive end at Fork Union Military Academy in 2004. He totaled 38 catches for 647 yards and five touchdowns on  offense and on defense he added five sacks, 51 tackles, and eight pass breakups. He had 20 catches for 430 yards and four scores as a senior and totaled 96 tackles and thirty four sacks as a senior. For that performance he was the MVP at Fork Union. After his senior year at Cordova High School, in Cordova, Tennessee, he played in the Tennessee/Kentucky All-Star game. He was also First-team All-state and All-region as a senior at Cordova High School.  He played tight end and defensive end and helped his team reach the 6A state play-offs.  Phillip had 9 quarterback sacks, 10 pass knock downs, 4 caused fumbles, 7 tackles for loss and he had 28 pass receptions for 415 yards and 4 touchdowns.  Prior to Fork Union, Merling attended Calhoun County High School in Saint Matthews, SC, for three years.

Merling was also All-conference, All-region, and All-area in basketball as a sophomore and junior. He averaged 20 points and 12 rebounds as a senior and averaged 15 points and 13 rebounds as a junior.

College career
Merling appeared in 38 games at Clemson, starting his final 26. He delivered 146 tackles (99 solos), 12 sacks for minus 80 yards, 31 stops for losses totaling 152 yards and 45 quarterback pressures.

In 2007, he recorded 78 total tackles (first among defensive linemen), including 17 tackles-for-loss and seven sacks. He was instrumental to the Tigers’ top 10 national ranking in scoring and total defense. Was voted Second-team All-ACC for his efforts.
He was named ACC Defensive Lineman of the Week three times, more than any other ACC player. It marked the first time since 2001 that a Clemson player was named ACC Player of the Week three times.

He started all 13 games of the 2006 season, finishing with 46 total tackles on Clemson's top-16 total and scoring defense. Merling had had 10 tackles for loss, second-most on the team behind Gaines Adams. Merling also recorded three sacks, 20 quarterback hurries and one forced fumble that year.

Merling played 271 snaps during his true freshman season in 2005. Won the 12th Man Award for the defense as a  freshman and was a Second-team freshman All-America defensive end by Rivals.com.

Statistics

Professional career

Pre-draft
Merling underwent a successful laparoscopic by athletic pubalgia surgeon Dr. William Myers to repair a sports hernia. As a result, he did not participate in most drills at the combine or the Clemson Pro day due to his recovery from surgery. However, on April 25, 2008, Merling had a private "pro day" for scouts and "performed well". Merling worked out hard for about 45 minutes. "The kid's a pretty safe pick," one scout said. "He's not going to get outflanked," another said, referring to Merling's stoutness at the point of attack. No numbers have been released from the workout.

Measurables
Height: 6'4½" Weight: 271 lbs
40-yard time: 4.63, 4.73, 4.84 (pre-combine)
225-pound bench press: 17 reps

Miami Dolphins

Merling was selected 32nd overall in the 2008 NFL Draft by the Miami Dolphins. Although being picked 32nd overall, Merling is considered a second-round pick due to the involvement of the New England Patriots in the Spygate Scandal, resulting in the loss of their first round pick. In Week 17 of the 2008 season, he intercepted a Brett Favre pass and returned it for a touchdown, helping the Dolphins clinch the 2008 AFC East Division championship.

Before the 2010 season he suffered a torn Achilles' Tendon and was ruled out for the season, although he was activated before the Dolphins' Week 13 game with Cleveland.

Merling was waived by the Dolphins on April 23, 2012. He had only made seven tackles over the last two seasons.

Green Bay Packers
Merling signed with the Green Bay Packers on May 23, 2012. He was released by the Green Bay Packers on November 6, 2012

Washington Redskins
The Washington Redskins signed Merling to a reserve contract on January 8, 2013. On October 1, he was released, along with John Potter, in order to make room on the roster for the reinstatement of Rob Jackson and Jarvis Jenkins.

NFL statistics

Key
 GP: games played
 COMB: combined tackles
 TOTAL: total tackles
 AST: assisted tackles
 SACK: sacks
 FF: forced fumbles
 FR: fumble recoveries
 FR YDS: fumble return yards 
 INT: interceptions
 IR YDS: interception return yards
 AVG IR: average interception return
 LNG: longest interception return
 TD: interceptions returned for touchdown
 PD: passes defensed

Personal
Merling was arrested in Broward County, Florida on May 26, 2010 and charged with aggravated battery against his then-fiancée Kristen Lennon, who was two months pregnant at the time. Merling was the second of two defensive linemen for the Miami Dolphins, Tony McDaniel being the first, to be arrested and charged with battery against a female during the 2010 offseason.  The charges were later dropped by the Broward State Attorney's Office after Lennon moved back to her home state of South Carolina and did not return to testify against him, because she could not travel, as she was 8 months pregnant at the time.

In the fall of 2014, Merling enrolled at Clemson, where he worked as a graduate assistant for the football team. He left the university that October. That same month, a warrant was issued for his arrest for failure to pay child support to Kristen Lennon.

References

External links
Clemson Tigers bio
Miami Dolphins bio

1985 births
Living people
People from Calhoun County, South Carolina
People from Memphis, Tennessee
Sportspeople from Portsmouth, Virginia
American football defensive tackles
American football defensive ends
Clemson Tigers football players
Miami Dolphins players
Green Bay Packers players
Washington Redskins players